Derek Christopher Shepherd, M.D., F.A.C.S., also referred to as "McDreamy", is a fictional surgeon from the ABC medical drama Grey's Anatomy, portrayed by actor Patrick Dempsey. He made his first appearance in the pilot episode, "A Hard Day's Night", which was broadcast on March 27, 2005.

Derek was married to Addison Montgomery (Kate Walsh) before their divorce in 2007. Before his death in 2015, Derek was happily married to his longtime partner and wife Meredith Grey (Ellen Pompeo). The couple had three children together. Shepherd was formerly the Chief of Surgery at Seattle Grace Mercy West (now Grey Sloan Memorial Hospital) but abruptly resigned from his position as Chief in season 7 following the shooting.

Dempsey was nominated for the 2006 and 2007 Golden Globes for Best Performance by an Actor in a Television Series Drama for the role, and the 2006 SAG Award for Outstanding Performance by an Actor in a Drama Series.

Storylines
Derek arrives at Seattle Grace Hospital as the new Head of Neurosurgery from New York City. He is a Bowdoin College graduate and attended Columbia University College of Physicians and Surgeons alongside his childhood best friend Mark Sloan and ex-wife Addison Montgomery and Private Practice characters Naomi Bennett and Sam Bennett. Derek was a student of Dr. Richard Webber and was enticed to come with an "offer he couldn’t refuse" – the position of Chief of Surgery, which he eventually turned down. He specializes in highly complex tumors and conditions of the brain and spine,  and came to Seattle Grace with a reputation for taking on "lost causes" and "impossible" cases that most of his peers would turn down. As an attending, he is both well-liked by patients and his scrub nurses for his compassion and polite bedside manner and feared by interns and residents who are intimidated by his reputation and high standards. He is passionate about his job and has been known to expel staff or remove students (or at least threaten them) from his service for being disrespectful about patients or if he deems their attitude to be detrimental to his patient's well-being.

Derek first meets Meredith Grey at a bar and has a one-night stand with her. He soon finds out that she is an intern at Seattle Grace. They begin to have feelings for one another, and it causes some awkwardness at work particularly after her supervising resident Dr. Miranda Bailey discovers their relationship. While most of his family members accepted Meredith, his sister, Nancy, particularly disliked her and repeatedly called her "the slutty intern"; as of season nine she still refuses to speak to Meredith or acknowledge her as her sister-in-law. His mother Carolyn approved as she felt Meredith's gray perspective of life complemented Derek's tendency to see everything in black and white.

Derek's background was generally a mystery for the first season and source of speculation amongst his colleagues due to his sudden departure from an established and highly respected practice in New York. In the season one finale, his past eventually catches up with him when his estranged wife Addison moves to Seattle and is offered a position by Dr. Webber. Shortly after that, his childhood best friend Mark joins Seattle Grace as the new head of plastic surgery. Derek and Addison attempt to repair their marriage but attempts were futile. Addison and Derek each began their practice in New York City, which placed a strain on their marriage. Their marriage was troubled in the years leading to Derek's decision to leave New York as it is eventually revealed in both Grey's Anatomy and Private Practice that Derek's mother did not approve of her (choosing to give her dead husband's ring to Derek's second wife,  Meredith Grey) and Addison's brother Archer disliked Derek. Addison's affair with Derek's best friend Mark Sloan drove the wedge even further and Derek's departure to Seattle. Addison briefly attempted to have a relationship with Mark, which resulted in her becoming pregnant. She then had an abortion soon after she discovered that Mark cheated on her, and as she was still in love with Derek. She then moved to Seattle. In the season eight episode "If/Then", Meredith dreams of an alternate universe where her mother never had Alzheimer's; Derek and Addison are still married, but their strained relationship and Shepherd's disillusionment causes his career to stagnate, earning him the nicknames "Bad Shepherd" and "McDreary".

When Derek is offered the Chief of Surgery position for the second time, he persuades the board to keep Dr. Webber on the staff. 
During the merger of Seattle Grace with Mercy West their relationship sours when Derek disagreed with Richard's handling of the merger and Richard begins to display uncharacteristic behavior. Derek learns from Meredith that Richard has since resumed drinking and feels forced to have him removed as Chief of Surgery. With mixed feelings, Derek offers him an ultimatum: go into rehab and pick up where he left off after, or retire from the hospital altogether.

In seasons three and four, Meredith and Derek's relationship becomes rocky, and they each take time to date other people. Derek's plans to propose were ruined by a series of unfortunate events in season five. In the season finale, they decide to give their planned wedding to Alex and Izzie. Due to their tight schedule, they instead informally marry, and Derek writes down their "vows" on a post-it note. They legalize their marriage in season seven in order to adopt Zola, a young African orphan treated for spina bifida. They briefly separate after Meredith tampers with their Alzheimer's trial, jeopardizing her career and tarnishing Derek's reputation. Zola is taken away from Meredith after a social worker finds out she and Derek are living separately.  Eventually, the social worker comes back and announces they are the official parents of Zola. As Meredith nears the end of her fifth year of residency, she and Derek are torn between staying at Seattle Grace Mercy West or leaving for Boston where Derek would work at Harvard while Meredith would be at the Brigham and Women's Hospital.

Following his rescue from the plane crash that killed Mark and Lexie, Derek learns that he may only regain 80 percent of his hand's function. He comes to terms with the fact that his career as a surgeon may be over and is grateful that he is alive. When Callie Torres (Sara Ramirez), head of orthopedic surgery, tells him a more risky surgery could give him back full function of his hand or reduce its function if it goes wrong, he agrees, accepting the possibility of never again holding a scalpel. Derek, Callie, and fellow resident, Jackson Avery, decide to do a nerve transplant for his hand. Meredith, newly pregnant with their second child, goes behind his back and calls his sisters so they can donate the nerve to him. Lizzie (Neve Campbell), Derek's younger sister, agrees to donate a nerve and the surgery is a success.

Derek and Meredith's marriage is strained after he accepted an invitation from the U.S. President to participate in the Brain-Mapping Initiative. He went back on his promise that he would not add to his current workload to devote time to their two young children and allow Meredith the chance to establish her career as a full-fledged attending. Eventually, he was offered a position at the National Institutes of Health in Washington, D.C., but Meredith puts her foot down and refuses to leave her hometown and uproot their young family. His youngest sister Amelia (Caterina Scorsone) takes over his position at Grey Sloan as Head of Neurosurgery. Meanwhile, he and Meredith fight bitterly off and on over whether they should move. After a tense argument, he accepts the job in the heat of the moment and leaves for Washington D.C. While there, he and Meredith talk things out over the phone and come to a mutual conclusion that they both did not want to end their marriage. He tells her that just being with her, raising their children and operating on patients was more satisfying than "saving the world".

In season 11, Derek is involved in a fatal car accident while driving to the airport for his final trip to Washington. He can hear and process auditory input but is unable to speak. He is recognized by Winnie, one of the victims of a crash he assisted in earlier, who tells the surgeons that their patient's name is Derek and that he is a surgeon as well. The hospital he is taken to is understaffed and under-equipped, and his head injury is not detected quickly enough by the arrogant doctors and inexperienced interns on duty that night; although one intern does suspect Derek had a head injury, her superior repeatedly shuts down her attempts to get him a head CT, prioritizing his abdominal bleeding beforehand and having him rushed into surgery even though he is stable enough for the CT. Although the neurosurgeon on call is paged multiple times after the doctors finally discover the head injury, he takes too long to arrive, and Derek is declared brain dead. Police arrive at Meredith's door and take her to see Derek, where she consents to remove him from life support. At the time of his death, Meredith is pregnant with their third child. After quietly leaving Seattle, she gives birth to a daughter whom she names Ellis after her mother.

Derek was mentioned or referenced several times in season 12 as the other characters struggle to cope with his sudden death. In the episode "My Next Life", Meredith had a flashback of their first ever surgery together when a patient named Katie Bryce was admitted to the hospital with a brain aneurysm. Amelia took his death especially hard as he was the sibling she was closest to. At the end of the season, before her wedding to Derek's long-time colleague Owen Hunt, Amelia goes on a nervous rant about how Derek was supposed to be the one to give her away, him having given away their three other sisters at their weddings. In season 17, he appears in a dream sequence on a beach as Meredith fights COVID-19 which leaves her comatose and thus experiencing an "afterlife" reality. Wanting to be with Derek, Derek informs her it's not her time to go and Meredith eventually wakes up, leaving Derek at the beach as he waves good-bye to her.

Development

Casting and creation
When Patrick Dempsey auditioned for the role of Derek Shepherd, he was afraid that he was not going to get the part. Creator Shonda Rhimes' first reaction was: "The very first time I met him, I was absolutely sure that he was my guy. Reading the lines of Derek Shepherd, Patrick had a vulnerable charm that I just fell for. And he had amazing chemistry with Ellen Pompeo." Rhimes admitted that Dempsey's dyslexia threw her at first, particularly at the first few table readings: "I did not know about Patrick's dyslexia in the beginning. I actually thought that he didn't like the scripts from the way he approached the readings. When I found out, I completely understood his hesitation. Now that we all know, if he is struggling with a word, the other actors are quick to step up and help him out. Everyone is very respectful." Isaiah Washington also auditioned for the part and when he did not get it, he said his reaction was like "I'd been kicked in the stomach by 14 mules." Washington was, however, later cast as Preston Burke. Rob Lowe was also considered to portray Shepherd but turned the role down in order to star in the short-lived CBS medical drama Dr. Vegas. Some of the character's medical cases were inspired by real-life patients of Steve Giannotta, Chair of Neurological Surgery at the University of Southern California Keck School of Medicine, whom Rhimes had consulted in writing for Shepherd's storylines and patients.

In January 2014, Dempsey signed a two-year contract to remain on Grey's Anatomy (then in its tenth season) that would ensure his presence for potential 11th and 12th seasons. However, in April 2015, Dempsey's character was killed off while his contract was not over yet. Dempsey explained: "it just sort of evolved. It’s just kind of happened. It really was something that was kind of surprising that unfolded, and it just naturally came to be. Which was pretty good. I like the way it has all played out."
In August 2015, Rhimes commented: 

The character was later written to be a graduate of Bowdoin College, a liberal arts college in Brunswick, Maine, after an alumnus led a petition signed by over 450 students to "adopt" the character as an alumnus.

On November 12, 2020, in the two-part season 17 premiere, Dempsey reprised his role of Derek in a dream sequence and appeared several more episodes during the season.

Characterization
Rhimes describes Shepherd as typical "Prince Charming". He was planned to be a doctor who doesn't really care about anything, who lives in his "own" universe and has a big sex appeal. A man who is charming, devilishly handsome and the type of guy every girl dreams of, and a man that often makes the wrong decisions, and is often known as a jerk or the ultimate heartbreaker. Rhimes planned to have this kind of character from the beginning because he was the kind of guy whom girls fall in love with and a character whose storylines could easily be changed. USA Today writer Robert Bianco said: "Derek could, at times, seem like two people, warm and funny one minute, cold and self-involved the next. Dempsey's gift was in making those two sides seem like part of the same person, while keeping us rooting for that person as a whole."

Reception

With the show concluding its second season, Robert Bianco of USA Today said that Emmy voters could consider him because of the "seemingly effortless way he humanizes Derek's 'dreamy' appeal with ego and vanity". In the third season, Alan Sepinwall of The Star-Ledger wrote that "the attempt to give the moral high ground back to McDreamy was bad. Dude, whatever happened in New York ceased to count in any kind of grievance tally once you agreed to take Addison back and give things another try. You're the dick who cheated on her, you're the one who knew that she found the panties, and still you act like her getting back together with Mark justifies what you did? Wow. I didn't think it was possible for me to dislike anyone on this show more than Meredith, but congratulations, big guy."

Debbie Chang of BuddyTV noted the character's immaturity in the fourth season, saying: "The only character who did not make me love him was Derek Shepherd (Patrick Dempsey). How this character is still Shonda's golden child is beyond me. Yes, we get it. He's tormented by his love for Meredith, but that does not give him the right to lash out at her when his clinical trial patients are dying. If things don't go absolutely the way he wants them to, then he refuses to cooperate. How immature can this man possibly be? No amount of heavily styled hair or blue-blue-blue eyes is going to make me warm up to him unless he admits to being the needy, desperate one in the relationship."

Entertainment Weekly placed Shepherd in its list of the "30 Great TV Doctors and Nurses". The character was also listed in Wetpaint's "10 Hottest Male Doctors on TV" and in BuzzFeed's "16 Hottest Doctors On Television". His relationship with Meredith was included in TV Guide'''s list of "The Best TV Couples of All Time".

Victor Balta of Today listed Shepherd and Sloan's friendship in its "TV's best bromances". He called them "the most exciting couple on Grey’s," explaining "they’ve demonstrated an easy chemistry that makes for some of the great comic relief around Seattle Grace Hospital with their banter, sage wisdom on each other’s lives, and locker room-style teasing." Their bromance was furthermore included in lists by About.com, BuddyTV, Cosmopolitan, Wetpaint. However, following the announcement of Dane's upcoming departure from the show, Mark Perigard of the Boston Herald'' felt he and Derek "never clicked like you’d expect friends would. Any scene they had together ranged from uncomfortable to forced."

Notes

References

External links
Grey's Anatomy at ABC.com

Grey's Anatomy characters
Fictional surgeons
Fictional characters from New York (state)
Fictional Columbia University people
Television characters introduced in 2005
Fictional neurosurgeons
American male characters in television